Andrei-Ionuț Ursu (born 16 January 1993), known professionally as Wrs (stylized in all lowercase), is a Romanian singer and dancer. Before starting his career as an artist, he worked as a dancer for famous artists such as Inna, Antonia or Carla's Dreams and was part of the Pro TV ballet on shows such as Vocea României and Românii au talent. In January 2020, he signed with Global Records and started the electro-pop music project with the stage name Wrs.

Life and career
Andrei-Ionuț Ursu was born in Buzău, Romania, on 16 January 1993. He started dancing at the age of 12 because he was encouraged by his parents, folk music dancers.

In 2015 he started his musical career in the boys' band Shot.  After two years, he left the project, moved to London and began composing music.

Wrs debuted in January 2020 with the song "Why".

In February 2022, Wrs released the single "Llámame", with which he represented Romania at the Eurovision Song Contest 2022.

Discography

Extended plays

Singles

As lead artist

Notes

References

External links 

 

1993 births
People from Buzău
21st-century Romanian singers
Global Records artists
English-language singers from Romania
Living people
Eurovision Song Contest entrants for Romania
Eurovision Song Contest entrants of 2022